J. orientalis  may refer to:
 Jaculus orientalis, the greater Egyptian jerboa, a rodent species found in North Africa
 Jixiangornis orientalis, a basal bird species from the Early Cretaceous

See also
 Orientalis (disambiguation)